Hirudinaria is a genus of large Asian leeches belonging to the family Cylicobdellidae; previously it was placed in the Hirudinidae.  It includes species such as H. manillensis that may be called "Asian medicinal leeches", but together with the genus Poecilobdella, they are also described as Asian buffalo leeches.

Species
The Global Biodiversity Information Facility lists:
 Hirudinaria bpling Phillips, 2012
 Hirudinaria javanica (Wahlberg, 1855) - type species
 Hirudinaria manillensis (Lesson, 1842)
 Hirudinaria thailandica Jeratthitikul & Panha, 2020
 Hirudinaria viridis Moore, 1927
Basionym now in genus Poecilobdella:
 Hirudinaria blanchardi Moore, 1901

References

External links

Annelid genera
Leeches